Saint Martha Cove is a small, almost landlocked cove on the northwest side of Croft Bay, close south of Andreassen Point, James Ross Island. Named on an Argentine map of 1959, presumably after Saint Martha, sister of Mary and Lazarus.

Coves of Graham Land
Landforms of James Ross Island